is the 21st single of the J-pop group Ali Project.

Release
This single was released on July 30, 2008 under the Victor Entertainment label.

Anime Tie-In
The single title was used as the second ending theme for Code Geass - Lelouch of the Rebellion R2 which marked their second tie-in with the said anime series after Yūkyō Seishunka.

Track listing

Charts and sales

References

2008 songs
2008 singles
Ali Project songs
Code Geass
Victor Entertainment singles
Anime songs
Song articles with missing songwriters